Jaroslav Zeman (born 10 February 1962) is a Czech wrestler. He competed at the 1988 Summer Olympics, the 1992 Summer Olympics and the 1996 Summer Olympics.

References

1962 births
Living people
Czech male sport wrestlers
Olympic wrestlers of Czechoslovakia
Olympic wrestlers of the Czech Republic
Wrestlers at the 1988 Summer Olympics
Wrestlers at the 1992 Summer Olympics
Wrestlers at the 1996 Summer Olympics
Sportspeople from Prague